The Sangre de Cristo Arts and Conference Center is an art center located in Pueblo, Colorado, United States. Founded in 1972 as a multi-disciplinary center for the arts, it features art galleries, performing arts, and the Buell Children's Museum. The Center is a multiple time, multiple category winner at the Best of Pueblo awards.

History
The Sangre de Cristo Arts and Conference Center opened in 1972, with funding provided by the Economic Development Administration and Pueblo County. The original two-building complex housed a single gallery, a five hundred seat theater, studio/classroom spaces, a dance studio and a conference/banquet facility.

In 1982, an expansion, funded by Puebloan Helen T. White, added three galleries, a gift shop and a small precursor children's museum.

In 2000, a further expansion added the 12,000 square-foot, two-level Buell Children's Museum and the Jackson Sculpture Garden.

Exhibitions

The art center features twenty-four new exhibitions a year in the Helen T. White Galleries. The King Gallery hosts the permanent collections.

Permanent
 Francis King Collection of Western Art
 Ruth Gast Santos and Southwest Collection
 Gene Kloss Collection
 Regional Contemporary Collection

References

External links

Buildings and structures in Pueblo, Colorado
Arts centres
Tourist attractions in Pueblo, Colorado
Museums in Pueblo County, Colorado